Judah Bergman, known as Jack Kid Berg or Jackie Kid Berg (28 June 1909 – 22 April 1991), was an English boxer born in the East End of London, who became the World Light Welterweight Champion in 1930.

Biography

Judah Bergman was born in Romford Street near Cable Street, St George in the East, Stepney.  His father Judah Senior, who found work as a tailor in America, and his mother Mildred immigrated from Odessa.  His siblings included Wolf, changed to Willie, Rebecca and Sarah.  He was apprenticed as a lather boy in a barber's shop, and began his boxing career at the Premierland, Back Church Lane, when he was 14.  Jewish Berg boxed with a Star of David on his trunks.

The book The Whitechapel Windmill covers the handsome boxer's rise in the boxing world as well as his flamboyant out-of-the-ring life, which is said to have included an affair with Mae West and a long-lasting friendship with fellow East Ender Jack Comer, the colourful (and also Jewish) gangster.

After losing his British Lightweight crown, he lived to be the oldest British boxing champion. Berg died in London on 22 April 1991.

He is commemorated by a blue plaque on Noble Court, Cable Street, close to the place where he was born. Stepney Historical Trust presented the plaque at a ceremony attended by the Chief Rabbi, the Bishop of Stepney Richard Chartres, Professor Bill Fishman, Councillor Albert lilley and the Retired Boxers Federation. Later in the evening the Trust held a Charity Ball to raise funds for the Retired Boxers Federation attended by Mr Cox, Chairman of the Boxing Association and also the local Arbour Youth and Repton Boxing Clubs Boys. Over a £1000 was raised for the Retired Boxing charity.

Career

Between 1923 and 1936, Berg had 192 professional fights, winning 157 of them. His record was 157–26–9.  Fifty seven wins were by knock out.

In 1931 he moved to the USA, where he won 64 out of 76 fights there. During his bouts in America, he was trained by legendary boxing trainer Ray Arcel.

In 1930, Berg defeated the great Cuban fighter Kid Chocolate in ten rounds. The Chocolate bout, fought in Queens, New York in 1932, had 10,000 spectators, larger than many of his British bouts. In 1930, he knocked out the American champion Mushy Callahan to take the World Light Welterweight Championship in London. The National Boxing Association (NBA) had stripped Callahan before this fight and Britain did not recognize this division, so only the New York State Athletic Commission recognized Berg as champion after this fight. The NBA only recognized Berg as champion after he beat Goldie Hess in January 1931.

Berg fought as a lightweight when he put his title on the line to meet with Tony Canzoneri in Chicago on 24 April 1931. He was quickly knocked out in three rounds, falling on his face and stumbling to get up before giving in and collapsing into the ropes. Berg, contending that he lost at lightweight and not at light welterweight, continued to claim that he was champion. Most of the boxing world recognized Canzoneri, however. He unsuccessfully challenged Canzoneri again for the title in September 1931.

After the Canzoneri bout, Berg continued boxing with mixed results. He became British lightweight champion in 1934 by beating the title holder Harry Mizler, another Jewish boxer.   He was thrust back into the limelight as a replacement for the injured Canzoneri against Cleto Locatelli at Madison Square Garden, but his hopes of challenging for the world title faded after a points defeat to Gustave Humery in Paris in February 1935, also losing a return bout in London in April, although Berg was still British champion at this point. Later that year he lost to Laurie Stevens in a fight for the British Empire lightweight title in Johannesburg. He returned to fighting at welterweight in the United States with some success. In August 1936, after three straight defeats, he announced his retirement, but returned in January 1937 with a victory against Ivor Pickens, the first of a nine fight unbeaten run. In January 1941 he moved up to middleweight to fight Harry Craster. He again beat Mizler in February 1941 and defeated British lightweight champion Eric Boon on a disqualification due to a low blow in a non-title fight in April 1941. After a victory over Eric Dolby in March 1945, Berg expressed a desire to once more challenge for a title, saying "What I need is fights. I'm a bad gymnasium worker, but I'll show what I can do in the ring. When I've had a few warm up fights I'll know where I stand. If I'm no good I'll quit." He had two further fights, the last a win by knockout against Johnny MacDonald in May 1945, before retiring.

Berg's brother Teddy was also a boxer, and the two fought on the same bill in 1941.

After retiring from boxing, he worked as a film stunt man, joined the Royal Air Force, and owned a restaurant in London.

Personal life
In 1930 Berg's marriage to New York University student Eleanor Kraus, the daughter of a New York silk merchant, was announced, although by November 1931 the relationship had ended. In September 1930 Berg was served with a writ claiming £10,000 for breach of promise by Sophia Levy, who claimed the two had a relationship. Berg married Bunty Pain, a dancer at the Trocadero, on 11 August 1933 at Prince's Row register office in London.

In October 1940 he was awarded £500 damages for slander after John Macadam suggested in a BBC broadcast that Berg would fight Eric Boon after "drawing his old-age pension" and "tottering along to Earl's Court", although the decision was overturned on appeal.

Hall of Fame
Berg was inducted into the International Boxing Hall of Fame.

Berg was also inducted into the World Boxing Hall of Fame.

Berg, who was Jewish, was inducted into the International Jewish Sports Hall of Fame in 1993.

Miscellaneous

Academic Howard Fredrics wrote an opera about Kid Berg's life.
The non-religious Berg used his Jewishness to get the crowd on his side, entering the ring wearing tephillin.
Alongside "The Battling Levinsky" is mentioned in the title track of Madness' "The Liberty of Norton Folgate"
Berg was the subject of an episode of ITV biographical documentary This Is Your Life in 1987.
On 19 June 1933, he was the guest of honour who officially opened Walthamstow Stadium.

Professional boxing record

See also
List of light welterweight boxing champions
List of British lightweight boxing champions
List of select Jewish boxers
Stepney Historical Trust

References and notes

Sources
Harold Finch The Tower Hamlets Connection – a Biographical Guide Stepney Books 
The Whitechapel Windmill by John Harding with Jack Kid Berg 1987, Robson Books

External links
 
 Sparring with Jack Kid Berg (1934) Article.
 Internet Movie Database listing for Jack Kid Berg
 Jack Kid Berg - CBZ Profile

English male boxers
Jewish boxers
Jewish American boxers
People from Stepney
English Jews
1909 births
1991 deaths
International Boxing Hall of Fame inductees
World light-welterweight boxing champions
World boxing champions
Boxers from Greater London
20th-century American Jews